Thil may refer to:

Places
Antarctica
 Thil Island

France
 Thil, Ain
 Thil, Aube
 Thil, Haute-Garonne
 Thil, Marne
 Thil, Meurthe-et-Moselle
 Thil-Manneville, Seine-Maritime
 Thil-sur-Arroux, Saône-et-Loire
 Château de Thil, a ruined castle near Dijon in Burgundy

People
 Grégory Thil (born 1980), French footballer
 Marcel Thil (1904–1968), French boxer

See also
 Til (disambiguation)
 Vic-sous-Thil, a commune near Château de Thil